= Alice Serber Petluck =

Jewish and female pioneer in law and social activist

- Born: July 23, 1873; Bar, Russian Empire
- Died: December 4, 1953 (aged 80); New York, U.S.
- Education: New York University School of Law

Alice S. Petluck (July 23, 1873 - December 4, 1953) was an American lawyer and social activist. She was an early Jewish and female pioneer in law, and her activism focused primarily on mothers.

== Early life and education ==
Petluck, one of three girls in her Jewish family, moved to the U.S. when she was 19. She learned English, then was admitted and graduated from the New York University School of Law in 1896. There were only six women total in her graduating class.

By 1916, she had married a physician, Dr. Joseph Petluck. Their three children all became lawyers.

== Career ==
Petluck's law career included her work within the 8th Assembly District of New York as well as one of the few women practicing for the Federal District Court in the Southern District of New York. She was also an early female pioneer at the intermediate court of appeals in New York.

In 1928, after being refused admittance to the Bronx Bar Association because of her gender, she created the Bronx Women's Bar Association. Her membership continued until her death.

Her career also included her activism, which earned her recognition as one of Bronx's leading twenty citizens in 1931.

Petluck's activism included her attendance as part of the Woman's Suffrage Party and the Bronx House Suffrage Club by 1916. She became president of the Mothers Welfare League of the Bronx in 1918, which served poor families. Her focus on children and mothers included work on deliquency and oral hygiene, as she affected change to get the first dental clinic at Junior School 55 in the Bronx, of which she was president of the Parents Association.

Petluck's involvement included numerous Jewish causes.
